Derek Owusu Boateng (born 2 May 1983) is a Ghanaian former professional footballer who played as a defensive midfielder. Born in Ghana, Boateng went on to play professional football in Greece, Sweden, Israel, Germany, Spain, Ukraine, England, and the United States during a career that spanned between 1999 and 2017. A full international between 2001 and 2013, he won 47 caps for the Ghana national team and represented his country at the 2006 and 2010 FIFA World Cups.

Club career

Early career 
Boateng was born in Accra, Greater Accra, where he played for the local side Liberty Professionals.

Greece 
He signed for Kalamata F.C. in Greece when he was 16. In 2001, Boateng joined another Greek Super League club Panathinaikos. In 2002, Boateng was unable to keep his place in the Panathinaikos squad and was sent on loan to OFI Crete.

AIK
He signed for AIK in August 2003. In the 2004 season, AIK was relegated from Allsvenskan for the third time in the history of the club. In the following season, AIK gained promotion after winning the Superettan, distancing runners-up Östers IF by nine points. Boateng extended his contract with AIK for one more year until the end of 2007. When he left for Beitar Jerusalem, Boateng stated in an interview that he loves Sweden and AIK, and that he one day will come back to Allsvenskan and AIK the team he supports.

Beitar Jerusalem 
In July 2006, Boateng signed with Beitar Jerusalem until January 2009. Boateng helped Beitar Jerusalem to win the league for the fifth time in their history, and for the first time for 10 years, contributing four goals in the campaign.

The 2007–08 season started off poorly for Boateng, as he got sent off during Beitar Jerusalem's first official game of the season, in leg one of the second qualifying round for the 2007–08 UEFA Champions League, away to F.C. Copenhagen. Beitar Jerusalem lost 2–1 on aggregate and were eliminated. Boateng ended the season with another championship for Beitar Jerusalem. At the Israel State Cup final, Boateng missed a penalty in a thrilling penalty shootout against Hapoel Tel Aviv, but Beitar Jerusalem secured the title with a 5–4 win at the shootout, and secured an historical double.

The 2008–09 season started with yet another early elimination at the second qualification round for the UEFA Champions League, this time with a 5–0 away defeat to Wisła Kraków, and 6–2 in aggregate.

Whilst with Beitar, Boateng received financial backing whilst raising a lawsuit against his former agent.

Köln and Getafe 
On 21 January 2009, Boateng signed a four-year contract with 1. FC Köln. However, on 31 July 2009, Getafe CF signed him from Köln for one million euros. He stayed at the Spanish club for just over two seasons, making 61 appearances and scoring two goals.

Dnipro Dnipropetrovsk 
On 20 June 2011, Boateng completed a move to Ukrainian club FC Dnipro Dnipropetrovsk, signing a four-year contract. For Dnipro Derek mostly played in the 2011–12, while the next season he was side benched by the head coach after playing the first couple of games for the first team. Later after playing some games for the reserve team, Boateng lost interest of playing for the club at all.

Fulham 
In May 2013, Boateng confirmed that he had moved on a free transfer to Premier League side Fulham on Ghanaian radio. He said, "I have signed a two-year deal with Fulham and will be training with them for the first time [on Tuesday]. "I believe it’s a good move and I’m finally happy to see this deal [confirmed]."

Fulham officially confirmed Boateng signed a one-year deal with an option for a further year on 22 May 2013. He featured in the 2013–14 English Premiership opener against Sunderland where he played only 65 minutes and was substituted by Giorgos Karagounis.

Rayo Vallecano and Eibar 
After his contract with Fulham expired, Boateng decided to join Spanish club Rayo Vallecano on 3 June 2014. However, only two months later, he was deemed surplus to requirements by manager Paco Jémez, and rescinded his link with the Madrid outfit on 18 August.

Hours after rescinding with Rayo, Boateng signed a one-year deal with fellow league club SD Eibar.

After leaving Eibar, Boateng returned to Beitar Jerusalem to train with them whilst looking for a move in the upcoming transfer window.

Rayo OKC 
On 25 January 2016, Boateng signed with expansion side Rayo OKC of the North American Soccer League.

OFI FC 
On 30 January 2017, Boateng signed with Football League side OFI Crete F.C. till the end of the season. It is expected with his experience to help the club in his effort to be promoted in the Superleague Greece.

International career

While playing for Panathinaikos in 2001, Boateng also played for the Ghana national football team at the FIFA World Youth Championship in Argentina, in which Ghana progressed to the final. After participating in a friendly with Ghana against French club Nice, he was selected for the Ghana squad at the 2006 FIFA World Cup. He made his first FIFA World Cup appearance on 17 June 2006, when he replaced Otto Addo at half-time in the 2–0 win against the Czech Republic. He was also selected for the national team for the 2010 FIFA World Cup, in which Ghana progressed to the quarter-finals.

Career statistics

International 
Appearances and goals by national team and year

Honours
AIK
 Superettan: 2005

Beitar Jerusalem
 Israeli Premier League: 2006–07, 2007–08
 Israel State Cup: 2008
Ghana U20
 FIFA World Youth Championship runner-up: 2001
Individual
2007–08 Israeli Premier League Best Foreign Player of the Year

References

External links
 
 
 
 Derek Boateng at aik.se 

1983 births
Living people
Ghanaian footballers
Footballers from Accra
Mfantsipim School alumni
Ghana international footballers
Ghana under-20 international footballers
1. FC Köln players
Panathinaikos F.C. players
Kalamata F.C. players
AIK Fotboll players
Getafe CF footballers
OFI Crete F.C. players
FC Dnipro players
Liberty Professionals F.C. players
Allsvenskan players
Superettan players
Super League Greece players
Football League (Greece) players
Israeli Premier League players
Bundesliga players
La Liga players
Ukrainian Premier League players
Beitar Jerusalem F.C. players
Ghanaian expatriate footballers
2006 FIFA World Cup players
2010 FIFA World Cup players
2002 African Cup of Nations players
2012 Africa Cup of Nations players
2013 Africa Cup of Nations players
Fulham F.C. players
Rayo Vallecano players
SD Eibar footballers
Rayo OKC players
Premier League players
North American Soccer League players
Expatriate footballers in Germany
Expatriate footballers in Greece
Expatriate footballers in Israel
Expatriate footballers in Sweden
Expatriate footballers in Spain
Expatriate footballers in Ukraine
Expatriate footballers in England
Expatriate soccer players in the United States
Ghanaian expatriate sportspeople in Sweden
Ghanaian expatriate sportspeople in Ukraine
Ghanaian expatriate sportspeople in England
Ghanaian expatriate sportspeople in the United States
Ghanaian expatriate sportspeople in Greece
Ghanaian expatriate sportspeople in Spain
Ghanaian expatriate sportspeople in Israel
Ghanaian expatriate sportspeople in Germany
Association football midfielders